Arthur Cayley Headlam  (2 August 1862 – 17 January 1947) was an English theologian who served as Bishop of Gloucester from 1923 to 1945.

Biography
Headlam was born in Whorlton, County Durham, the son of its vicar, Arthur William Headlam (1826–1908), by his first wife, Agnes Favell. The historian James Wycliffe Headlam was his younger brother. He was educated at Winchester College and New College, Oxford, where he read Greats. He was a Fellow of All Souls College, Oxford, from 1885. He was ordained in 1888, and became Rector of Welwyn in 1896. In 1900 Headlam married Evelyn Persis Wingfield.

He was Professor of Dogmatic Theology at King's College London from 1903–1916, where he served as Principal from 1903 to 1912 and as the first Dean from 1908 until 1913. He was Regius Professor of Divinity, Oxford from 1918 to 1923. His 1920 Bampton Lectures showed the theme of ecumenism that would preoccupy him. At the time of the 1926 General Strike, he opposed the intervention of some of the other bishops.

He was influential in the Church of England's council on foreign relations in the 1930s, chairing the Committee on Relations with Episcopal Churches. He supported the Protestant Reich Church in Germany, and was a critic of the Confessing Church. He is thus generally considered an 'appeaser'. During the Nazi rise to power in 1933 he blamed German Jews for causing their own persecution, writing that they caused "the violence of the Russian Communists" and "Socialist communities" and were "not altogether a pleasant element in German, and in particular Berlin life."

He was appointed to the Order of the Companions of Honour (CH) in the 1921 Birthday Honours for his services at Oxford.

Selected publications
 With William Sanday, A Critical and Exegetical Commentary on the Epistle to the Romans. Edinburgh: T&T Clark, 1895. Fifth Edition: 1902.
 
  
 
  With William Sanday, Frederick Kenyon, F. Crawford Burkitt, & J. H. Bernhard.

References

Notes

Bibliography
 Arthur Cayley Headlam, Oxford Dictionary of National Biography
 Agnes Headlam-Morley, (1948) memoir in A. C. Headlam, The Fourth Gospel as History

Further reading

External links
 Bibliographic directory from Project Canterbury

1862 births
1947 deaths
20th-century Church of England bishops
Academics of King's College London
Alumni of New College, Oxford
Bishops of Gloucester
Deans of King's College London
English theologians
English Anglican theologians
Fellows of All Souls College, Oxford
Fellows of Christ Church, Oxford
Fellows of King's College London
Members of the Order of the Companions of Honour
New Testament scholars
People educated at Reading School
People educated at Winchester College
People from County Durham (district)
Principals of King's College London
Regius Professors of Divinity (University of Oxford)
19th-century Anglican theologians
20th-century Anglican theologians